Ministry of Population and Environment is governmental body of Nepal to implement population and environment policies, plans and programmes.

References

Government ministries of Nepal
Environmental agencies in Nepal